Dimple Bhagat (born 12 December 1998) is an Indian professional footballer who plays as a left back for Indian Super League side Hyderabad.

Club career
Born in Jammu and Kashmir, Bhagat began his career in the Pune academy before the academy was bought by Indian Super League side Pune City.

In 2018, Dimple left the Pune City academy to join I-League side Gokulam Kerala. He made his professional debut on 15 December 2018 in the league against Real Kashmir. He started and played the full match as Gokulam Kerala drew 1–1. He played three more matches for Gokulam Kerala before leaving the club.

In January 2020, Bhagat signed with Indian Super League side Hyderabad. He made his debut for the club on 15 January 2020 in the league against Odisha. He started the match but was sent off 2 minutes into first-half stoppage time, which earned Odisha a penalty which they converted and soon won the match 2–1.

Career statistics

Club

References

External links
Profile at the Indian Super League website
Profile at the All India Football Federation website

1998 births
Living people
People from Jammu and Kashmir
Indian footballers
Association football defenders
Pune FC players
FC Pune City players
Gokulam Kerala FC players
Hyderabad FC players
I-League players
Indian Super League players
Footballers from Jammu and Kashmir